These are the results for the 2004 edition of the Deutschland Tour cycling race, which was won by Germany's Patrik Sinkewitz.

Final classification

Stages

31-05-2004: Karlsruhe-Karlsruhe, 23 km

01-06-2004: Bad Urach-Wangen im Allgäu, 180 km

02-06-2004: Wangen im Allgäu-St. Anton am Arlberg, 170 km

03-06-2004: Bad Tölz-Landshut, 190 km

04-06-2004: Kelheim-Kulmbach, 192 km

05-06-2004: Kulmbach-Oberwiesenthal, 180 km

06-06-2004: Chemnitz-Leipzig, 170 km

External links
Race website
Wielersite Results

2004
2004 in road cycling
2004 in German sport
May 2004 sports events in Europe
June 2004 sports events in Europe